The Clausensee is a reservoir in the Schwarzbach valley in the western Palatine Forest in the German state of Rhineland-Palatinate.

Geography 
The Clausensee lies about ten kilometres east of the B 270 federal highway (from Kaiserslautern to Pirmasens) between Waldfischbach-Burgalben and Leimen. The Schwarzbach stream, also known in this section as the Burgalb,  flows through the reservoir. 

Properties 
In the middle of the lake, which is up to  metres deep, is an island. The water quality is assessed as "better than average".

Tourism 
The lake is used for tourism purposes. By the shore is a campsite and an unsupervised beach. On the last weekend in July there is an annual lake festival. Sights around the lake are described in the German article on the Schwarzbach valley.

Südwestpfalz
Rivers and lakes of the Palatinate Forest
Reservoirs in Rhineland-Palatinate
Western Palatinate
RClausensee
Rivers and lakes of Western Palatinate